The domain name .tel is a top-level domain (TLD) in the Domain Name System (DNS) of the Internet. It was approved by ICANN as a sponsored top-level domain, and is operated by Telnic. Telnic announced in January 2011 that over 300,000 domains had been registered since the start of general availability on 24 March 2009. A substantial drop of mostly IDN .tels occurred at the beginning of 2014 - the current total registered .tels as of 21 July 2016 is 98,516.

The domain's purpose is to provide a single name space for Internet communications services. Subdomain registrations serve as a single point of contact for individuals and businesses, providing a global contact directory service by hosting all types of contact information directly in the Domain Name System, without the need to build, host or manage a traditional web service.  Additionally, as of July 2010, every .tel domain acts as an OpenID and an increasing number of Voice over Internet Protocol (VoIP) clients can address a .tel domain name directly. The TLD implementation also supports the hCard micro-format.

Administration of domains
Telnic started publicly accepting applications for name registrations on 3 February 2009 after a closed Sunrise period for trademark holders.  Information in .tel can be controlled by the owner through a website control panel that Telnic has created for registrars to provide to their customers, or through free clients for BlackBerry, Microsoft Outlook, iPhone, Android and some third party VoIP softphone clients.  With the introduction of support for OAuth in July 2010, however, new third-party clients and services are available to tel registrants for publishing records to their domains securely, including the possibility of editing information offline via SMS gateways. The control panel is an open source application, and can be changed or completely replaced by registrars, as the application programming interfaces required to manage  information in the DNS were released by Telnic in October 2008.

When viewed over the Web, all tel domains point directly to a Telnic proxy webpage that is populated on the fly presenting the respective domain name owner's contact data stored within the DNS.   domains can also be accessed without opening a browser on many devices through open source applications or through direct DNS lookups.

Since 13 March 2017 additionally other name servers could be set for tel domains, which allows administration of domain name system records. Now tel domains behave like ordinary domains and could be used for web hosting and email.

Technical overview
In contrast to other top-level domains, .tel information is stored directly within the Domain Name System (DNS), within the actual domain name record, as opposed to the DNS simply returning details (such as IP addresses) of the machines on which information can be found. For example, users who register a .tel domain using Telnic name servers cannot create a type A Resource Record with the IP address of their own host. A user who wants to host a web site or run an own web server has to set own or providers' name servers.

As Telnic has enabled the DNS records to be encrypted using 1024-bit RSA with PKCS#1.5 padding and stored in sub-folders which are hidden until paired with a public private key handshake with individuals, there is protection from spammers.  As .tel also supports any type of contact information, concierge services like temporary email addresses, temporary telephone numbers and so on can all be utilized for additional protection of public information.

Reliability of data
The .tel TLD was released to trademark holders only until 3 February 2009, perhaps suggest that the resulting database of contact information can somehow be trusted as the official contact information of the rightful owner of those trademarks.  However, after the short period of registrations restricted to trademark holders only (the Sunrise period), anyone willing to pay a premium price was allowed to buy any domain name (the Landrush period) regardless of who owned the trademark.

Furthermore, during General Availability, anyone is able to register any name (assuming that it is available for registration) without paying a premium price.

The information held under the .tel domain is no more accurate or trustworthy than any other user defined data held in the DNS.  It will be down to individual .tel owners to choose what they wish to store there.

As with all other gTLDs, trademark owners can utilize the Uniform Domain-Name Dispute-Resolution Policy (UDRP) to claim trademarked domains back.

Differences from domain .mobi
Since some of the services that are expected to use tel domains can be achieved on mobile telephones, there may be overlap with the intended use of the mobi domain, which was also approved by ICANN in the same round.

However, .tel is about publishing contact data: phone numbers, SIP addresses and so on directly in the DNS, not on HTML-based websites., whereas the focus of the .mobi domain is providing web sites and other content formatted specifically for the user interface available on mobile phones and other mobile devices.

Alternative usage proposal
Pulver.com (operated by Jeff Pulver) also submitted an application for the .tel TLD, but had a different intent. This proposal involved telephone number style numeric identifiers. Alternative viewpoints claimed that this either complemented or conflicted with telephone number mapping (ENUM). Purely numeric identifiers have now been approved for release by Telnic and will be released later in 2011, with the restriction that single-digit .tel domains be withheld in order to avoid confusion with ENUM.

References

External links
 Telnic –  sponsoring organization
 IANA  –  whois information

Sponsored top-level domains
Computer-related introductions in 2005

sv:Toppdomän#Generiska toppdomäner